The Douglasville Commercial Historic District in Douglasville, Georgia is a historic district which was listed on the National Register of Historic Places in 1989.

In 1989 the area included 35 contributing buildings, a contributing structure, a contributing site, and a contributing object. Broad St. is now also known as Veterans Memorial Highway and as U.S. Route 78.

It comprises the historic commercial area of Douglasville.  It includes the modern Douglas County Courthouse and the historic courthouse square with historic landscaping, a 1914 Civil War monument, and a World War II monument.  The courthouse square is the oldest resource.  The district includes the historic railroad right-of-way across Broad Street through this downtown district.  The oldest buildings were built in the 1880s.

Selected buildings include:
Douglasville Banking Company, in Beaux Arts style
the former Gulf Oil Company service station, in Tudor Revival, from 1920s
Palace Barber Shop, from c.1890s
Masonic Lodge (c.1924) (see photo #13), at northeast corner of Church & Price Sts.
Farmers & Merchants Bank (c.1912)

The district was deemed significant as a typical Georgia railroad town's downtown commercial area.

References

Historic districts on the National Register of Historic Places in Georgia (U.S. state)
National Register of Historic Places in Douglas County, Georgia
Italianate architecture in Georgia (U.S. state)

Late 19th and Early 20th Century American Movements architecture
Buildings and structures completed in 1874